The 1992 NCAA Division I Tennis Championships were the 46th annual championships to determine the national champions of NCAA Division I men's singles, doubles, and team collegiate tennis in the United States.

Stanford defeated Notre Dame in the championship final, 5–0, to claim the Cardinal's twelfth team national title. With this win, Stanford swept all three men's tennis titles (team, singles, and doubles).

Host sites
The men's tournaments were played at the Dan Magill Tennis Complex in Athens, Georgia, hosted by the University of Georgia. 

The men's and women's tournaments would not be held at the same site until 2006.

See also
NCAA Division II Tennis Championships (Men, Women)
NCAA Division III Tennis Championships (Men, Women)

References

External links
List of NCAA Men's Tennis Champions

NCAA Division I tennis championships
NCAA Division I Men's Tennis Championships
NCAA Division I Men's Tennis Championships
NCAA Division I Men's Tennis Championships
Tennis tournaments in Georgia (U.S. state)